The 2017 Maryland Terrapins men's soccer team represented the University of Maryland, College Park during the 2017 NCAA Division I men's soccer season. It was the 72nd season of the university fielding a program. The Terrapins were led by 25th year head coach, Sasho Cirovski.

The season took a downturn towards the end as the Terrapins, then-ranked third in the nation went on a five match losing streak, that saw them fall out of the national rankings, and suffer a quarterfinal-bounce from the 2017 Big Ten Conference Men's Soccer Tournament. Nevertheless, the Terrapins qualified via an at-large for the NCAA Division I Men's Soccer Tournament for the 17th consecutive season. In their sole NCAA Tournament match this season, the Terps hosted Albany, where they lost in penalties.

Background 
During the 2016 regular season, Maryland finished as the winners of the regular season as well as the Big Ten Tournament. However, the team lost in the second round of the NCAA Tournament to Providence.

Roster 

As of September 26, 2017

Schedule 

|-
|-
!colspan=8 style=""| Regular season
|-

|-
!colspan=8 style=""| Big Ten Tournament
|-

|-
!colspan=8 style=""| NCAA Tournament
|-

Statistics

Transfers

See also 
2017 Big Ten Conference men's soccer season
2017 Big Ten Conference Men's Soccer Tournament
2017 NCAA Division I Men's Soccer Championship

References 

Maryland Terrapins men's soccer seasons
Maryland Terrapins
Maryland Terrapins
Maryland Terrapins, soccer men
Maryland